Gilbert Hewson (died 1951) was an Irish politician. He was elected to Dáil Éireann as an Independent Teachta Dála (TD) for the Limerick constituency at the June 1927 general election. He lost his seat at the September 1927 general election and was an unsuccessful candidate at the 1932 general election.

He died at his home at Lough House, Ballyengland, Askeaton.

Family
The son of John B. Hewson, of Castle Hewson, Askeaton, County Limerick, Gilbert Hewson was a barrister, and served as a member of Limerick County Council for many years. A son, Maurice Hewson, was a former district commissioner and member of the British colonial administration of the Gold Coast.

Bono (Paul Hewson) is a relative of Gilbert Hewson.

References

Year of birth missing
1951 deaths
Independent TDs
Members of the 5th Dáil
Politicians from County Limerick